Chiclana may refer to:

 Chiclana de la Frontera, a town and municipality in the province of Cádiz, Andalusia, Spain
 Chiclana de Segura, a city in the province of Jaén, Spain
 Chiclana CF, a football club based in Chiclana de la Frontera
 Alexis Chiclana (born 1987), Puerto Rican judoka
 Feliciano Chiclana (1761–1826), Argentine lawyer, soldier, and judge